"I Need" is a song by Irish singer Maverick Sabre, from his debut studio album Lonely Are the Brave. It was released on 4 November 2011 as a digital download in the United Kingdom.

Music video
A music video to accompany the release of "I Need" was first released onto YouTube on 16 September 2011 at a total length of four minutes and two seconds. In the video, Stafford travels back to his native town of New Ross. The video features many locals of the town and places like 'Aladdins cave' and 'New Ross Crystal'.

Reception 
Robert Copsey  of Digital Spy gave the song a positive review stating:

Little more than strings, drums and an electric organ play out over Sabre's self-penned words about remembering the good ol' days. "I need blue skies/ I need them old times/ I need something good," he rap-sings is his inimitable twang on a gravelly chorus that burrows deeper into your brain with each listen. Don't worry mate, we have a sneaking suspicion that things will pick up again very soon. .

Track listing

Charts

Certifications

Release history

References

2011 singles
Maverick Sabre songs
Contemporary R&B ballads
2011 songs
Mercury Records singles